Cut & Move is the second full-length studio album by hard rock band Day of Fire, released on June 6, 2006. The album was produced by Pete Thornton, who has worked with the likes of Limp Bizkit. "Run" was the theme song for WWE Unforgiven 2006. It is the band's only album as a five-piece.

Track listing

Credits 
 Josh Brown - vocals
 Chris Pangallo - Bass
 Joe Pangallo - Guitar
 Gregg Hionis - Guitar
 Zach Simms - drums

References 

2006 albums
Day of Fire albums
Essential Records (Christian) albums